Fish Rap Live!, also known as FRL!, is a triquarterly alternative humor publication at the University of California, Santa Cruz.

Recognition 
The paper received two Gold Circle Awards from the Columbia Scholastic Press Association in 2002 in the General or Humor Column and Ad Design categories and one in 1999 for Illustration Portfolios and Editorial Cartooning. It also continues to receive recognition and is consistently ranked amongst the top college humor publications in the country.

Features

Ongoing

News Briefs - News satire in the style of The Onion.

Editorials - Humorous first-person articles written under a variety of different characters, fictional or not.

Overheard in Santa Cruz - Reader-submitted recollections of humorous, and often frightening,  exchanges overheard around the Santa Cruz area.

Why the Fuck Are You Still Talking? - Fake interviews that revolve around a central question.

Recurring

Classes to Audit - A quarterly parody of upcoming or current classes at UCSC. Examples include: "CMPE 80E: Intro to Networking - Prepare for hundreds of business cards and firm handshakes.", "CHEM 122: Instrumental Analysis - Yeah, I'm pretty sure this one's a tuba.", "ANTH 80H: Acoustic Culture - Taught by that guy in Porter Quad who plays "Skinny Love" on his Fender acoustic." and "PHIL 139: Freud - Your mom."

Dive Team - One or more editors travels to a local Dive Bar and tells of their experience. In recent years, this has been expanded to include a myriad of other stories, including one of a Yu-Gi-Oh! tournament and one of an editor's experience of trying to keep bees.

The Fish Rappies - Annual parody of prestigious national awards. Examples include "Best Bond: Covalent. Worst Bond: Roger Moore", and "Best Bono: Pro Bono, Worst Bono: Bono."

The Freshman Circus - A parody of The Family Circus. The comic strip lampoons the naiveté of UCSC underclassmen fumbling their way through their first year of college.

From: Blank To: Blank, With Love - Short letters from writers taking the perspective of people, places, animals, and objects addressing other people, places, objects and such.

Scavenger Hunt - An annual scavenger hunt that puts the participants in harm's way, in embarrassing situations, or prompts practical jokes. Examples include: "Cut off 5 Livestrong bracelets", "Ghost Ride 'da Whip", "Stage a fake public breakup", and "Date a FRL! staff member, extra points per base reached." The prize is usually nominal amounts of both cash and fame.

Bad Romance - A personal diary entry or letter of the various trials and tribulations of desire, lust, and love.

Point, Counterpoint - Duel editorials making opposing arguments. Topics include: visiting Sacramento, 7-Eleven, and the ground.

Editors-in-chief

Fish Rap Live!
 2022-22: Ty Sterling Jayo Kuo David Tuffs
 2021-22: Ezra Lux and Torrey "Wormson" Brownell
 2020-21: Ezra Lux and Josh Gillespie
 2019-20: Audrey Hebert and Julia Neal
 2018-19: Frances Maurer and Cactus "William" Yates
 2017-18: Christian Miley and Julia Ryan
 2016-17: Isabella Cook and Maddy Corich
 2015-16: Billy Butler and Jeremy Lessnau
 2013-15: Skyler Hanrath and Ryan Schreiber
 2012-13: Megan Delyani
 2010-12: Emmy Ballard and James Shea
 2009-10: Erin Schmalfeld
 2008-09: Sabrina Vogeley
 2007-08: Brian Hickey
 2006-07: Janelle Evans
 2005-06: Nick Kam
 2004-05: Mike Beitiks
 2003-04: Adam Ted Jacobson
 2002-03: Phil Eichenauer
 2001-02: Jason "J. Lo" Louv
 2000-01: Andy Lochrie
 1999-00: John Hirst
 1998-99: Jeff Williams
 1997-98: Charlie Padow
 1996-97: Michelle Riche
 1995-96: Jennifer Maerz
 1994-95: Eric F. Lipton
 1993-94: Derek Powazek and Robin Krieger
 1992-93: Grif Cherry and Nick Cain
 1990-92: David Holthouse and Kurt Opsahl

Cowell Fish Rap
 1987-88: Richard Thompson
 1986-87: Ari Kahan
 1985-86: Robert Bielen

See also 
UC Santa Cruz
City on a Hill Press
KZSC Radio

References

External links
Official Fish Rap Live! Website 
Fish Rap issue archives 

University of California, Santa Cruz
Satirical newspapers
Newspapers published in the San Francisco Bay Area
Alternative weekly newspapers published in the United States
Student newspapers published in California